Baby Face is an American brand of baby dolls that were manufactured by Galoob in 1990-1991. They were designed by toy inventor Mel Birnkrant.

Baby Face dolls are all vinyl, 13 inches tall, chubby babies with extra joints at knees and elbows in addition to joints at hips, shoulders and neck. They are strung dolls with fixed eyes and rooted hair. The Baby Face series included 20+ dolls and more than a dozen different face molds. The dolls can be identified by a number on the back of the neck.

In 1990-1991, Galoob Toys, Inc. conducted a competition for the next Baby Face Doll. The competition consisted of judging photos sent by the entrants. A second place winner, received a Baby Face Doll that resembles the facial expression of their photo.*cited 

They sold very well. However, due to events and politics within the toy industry, the dolls were discontinued in spite of the fact that they were a best seller. 
Baby Face dolls are collectable today. There are websites and collector clubs devoted to Baby Face dolls.

List of dolls

1 So Sweet Sandi - blonde hair, blue eyes
1 So Sweet Marcy - lavender ponytail, blonde hair, blue eyes
2 So Surprised Suzie - blonde hair, blue eyes
2 So Surprised Suzie black - dark brown hair & eyes
3 So Happy Heidi - dark brown hair, light brown eyes
3 So Happy Mia - blonde hair, green eyes
4 So Loving Laura - blonde hair, dark brown eyes
5 So Funny Natalie - medium blonde hair, green eyes
5 So Funny Natalie black - dark brown hair & eyes
6 So Sorry Robyn - dark brown hair, brown eyes
6 So Sorry Sarah - blonde hair, blue eyes
6 So Sorry Sarah black - dark brown hair & eyes
7 So Innocent Cynthia - blonde hair, blue eyes
7 So Innocent Charlene - pink ponytail, blonde hair, brown eyes
8 So Delightful Dee Dee - platinum blonde hair, lavender eyes or blue eyes
8 So Delightful Dee Dee black - dark brown hair & eyes
8 So Daring Denny - Boy Doll in baseball uniform, blonde hair with side part, blue eyes (sold only in France.) 
9 So Shy Sherri - red hair, green eyes
9 So Shy Sheila - pale pink ponytail, blonde hair, blue eyes
9 So Shy Sherri black - dark brown hair & eyes
10 So Playful Penny - honey blonde hair, blue eyes
10 So Playful Penny black - dark brown hair & eyes
10 So Playful Beth - yellow ponytail, blonde hair, blue eyes
14 So Cute Carmen (Hispanic) - short, curly, dark brown hair, dark brown eyes
14 So Tender Tina (Hispanic) - short, curly, dark brown hair, light brown eyes
15 So Caring Karen - blonde hair, blue eyes
16 So Silly Sally - blue ponytail, blonde hair, blue eyes, missing some teeth
17 So Merry Kerri (Asian) - short black hair, dark brown eyes
17 So Excited Naomi (Asian) - long black hair, dark brown eyes
20 So Happy Hannah (bathtub) - dark brown hair, brown eyes
20 So Happy Hannah black (bathtub) - dark brown hair & eyes
21 So Curious Cara (bathtub) - platinum hair, blue eyes
21 So Curious Cara black (bathtub) - dark brown hair & eyes
22 So Bashful Abby black (bathtub) - brown hair & eyes
23 So Excited Becca (bathtub) - blonde hair, blue eyes
23 So Excited Becca black (bathtub) - black hair, brown eyes
24 So Sad Brook (bathtub) - blonde hair, brown eyes

In addition to the dolls (above) that were mass-produced in China, there were some prototype dolls that were under consideration. Some of the prototype dolls made their way into the hands of collectors and are extremely rare. So Bossy Beverly, So Whistling Wendy, Black Sally, So Cheerful Charlie and other variations nearly made it to production before the series was cancelled.

Works cited

 

 

 

• Galoob, Inc. letter congratulatory.

Doll brands